The 29th parallel north is a circle of latitude that is 29 degrees north of the Earth's equatorial plane. It crosses Africa, Asia, the Pacific Ocean, North America and the Atlantic Ocean.

At this latitude the sun is visible for 14 hours, 0 minutes during the summer solstice and 10 hours, 18 minutes during the winter solstice. The northernmost extremity in which the moon can pass through the zenith at some point during the 18.6 year Saros cycle lies slightly south of this parallel.

Around the world
Starting at the Prime Meridian and heading eastwards, the parallel 29° north passes through:

See also
28th parallel north
30th parallel north

References

n29